Jorge Elias dos Santos (born 6 June 1991) is a Brazilian footballer who plays for FC Taraz.

Career

Club career
On 6 February 2020 it was confirmed, that Elias had joined FK Panevėžys in Lithuania.

References

External links
 
 

1991 births
Living people
Brazilian footballers
2. Liga (Austria) players
Rio Claro Futebol Clube players
Kapfenberger SV players
Mogi Mirim Esporte Clube players
Associação Desportiva Recreativa e Cultural Icasa players
FC Chornomorets Odesa players
Hibernians F.C. players
Associação Atlética Internacional (Limeira) players
FK Panevėžys players
Ukrainian Premier League players
Brazilian expatriate footballers
Brazilian expatriate sportspeople in Austria
Expatriate footballers in Austria
Brazilian expatriate sportspeople in Ukraine
Expatriate footballers in Ukraine
Brazilian expatriate sportspeople in Malta
Expatriate footballers in Malta
Brazilian expatriate sportspeople in Lithuania
Expatriate footballers in Lithuania
Association football forwards